Petar Dimitrov (born 28 February 1982) is a Bulgarian footballer who plays as a winger or forward. Dimitrov is an attacking right midfielder.

Career
Dimitrov played for a few clubs, including CSKA Sofia, Belasitsa Petrich, Vihren Sandanski and Beroe Stara Zagora.
 
In August 2005, Dimitrov made appearances for CSKA Sofia in a 3–1 home loss against Liverpool F.C. in a Champions League qualification match and a 1:0 win over the same team in the return leg.

On 18 October 2009, Dimitrov scored the only goal for Beroe (in the 84th minute) to bring about a 1–0 away win against defending champions Levski Sofia, contributing to the sacking of their coach.

On 15 January 2016 he signed for V Group team Etar Veliko Tarnovo after leaving Lokomotiv 2012 Mezdra as the team had financial trouble. He was leading goalscorer in B Group and the transfer was described as "transfer bomb". He left the team in January 2017.

In February 2017, Dimitrov joined Kariana Erden but was released in May.

On 20 June 2017, Dimitrov signed with the newly promoted to Second League club Strumska Slava. He was released at the end of November.

In the summer 2020, Dimitrov joined Lokomotiv Mezdra. During 2021, Dimitrov also played for OFK Kostinbrod.

References

1982 births
Living people
Footballers from Sofia
Bulgarian footballers
First Professional Football League (Bulgaria) players
Second Professional Football League (Bulgaria) players
FC Botev Vratsa players
PFC Spartak Pleven players
PFC Belasitsa Petrich players
PFC CSKA Sofia players
OFC Vihren Sandanski players
PFC Beroe Stara Zagora players
PFC Slavia Sofia players
Neftochimic Burgas players
FC Lokomotiv 1929 Sofia players
PFC Lokomotiv Mezdra players
SFC Etar Veliko Tarnovo players
FC Strumska Slava Radomir players
Association football forwards